Andy Henderson, Sr was an Australian soccer player and coach who played as a midfielder.

Born in Scotland, he came to Australia at 23 where he said he learnt his soccer.

Henderson played two matches for the Australian national football team in 1924.

Henderson was the father of national team player Bill Henderson. They became the first father–son combination for Australia.

References

Australian soccer players
Australian soccer coaches
Association football midfielders
Australia international soccer players
Year of birth missing
Year of death missing